Charles Albert Henderson (14 January 1883 – 11 December 1957) was a Liberal party member of the House of Commons of Canada. He was born in Pana, Illinois, United States and became a farmer by career.

Henderson attended school in Newport, Nebraska and Alvin, Texas. He moved to Canada in 1908.

He was first elected to Parliament at the Kindersley riding in the 1940 general election after unsuccessful campaigns there in 1930 and 1935. After one term in the House of Commons, he was defeated by Frank Jaenicke of the Co-operative Commonwealth Federation in the 1945 federal election. He died in 1957 and is buried in Dodsland.

References

External links
 

1883 births
1957 deaths
American emigrants to Canada
Canadian farmers
Liberal Party of Canada MPs
Members of the House of Commons of Canada from Saskatchewan
People from Pana, Illinois